

522001–522100 

|-bgcolor=#f2f2f2
| colspan=4 align=center | 
|}

522101–522200 

|-bgcolor=#f2f2f2
| colspan=4 align=center | 
|}

522201–522300 

|-bgcolor=#f2f2f2
| colspan=4 align=center | 
|}

522301–522400 

|-bgcolor=#f2f2f2
| colspan=4 align=center | 
|}

522401–522500 

|-bgcolor=#f2f2f2
| colspan=4 align=center | 
|}

522501–522600 

|-id=563
| 522563 Randyflynn ||  || Randy L. Flynn (born 1963), is an American amateur astronomer who operates the Squirrel Valley Observatory  in western North Carolina. Randy submits important follow-up observations of Near-Earth Asteroids to the Minor Planet Center and was awarded the Shoemaker NEO Grant in 2019 to help further his efforts (Src). || 
|}

522601–522700 

|-bgcolor=#f2f2f2
| colspan=4 align=center | 
|}

522701–522800 

|-bgcolor=#f2f2f2
| colspan=4 align=center | 
|}

522801–522900 

|-bgcolor=#f2f2f2
| colspan=4 align=center | 
|}

522901–523000 

|-bgcolor=#f2f2f2
| colspan=4 align=center | 
|}

References 

522001-523000